Polyphylla hirsuta is a species in the subfamily Melolonthinae ("May beetles and junebugs"), in the order Coleoptera ("beetles").
It is found in North America.

References

Further reading
 Arnett, R.H. Jr., M. C. Thomas, P. E. Skelley and J. H. Frank. (eds.). (2002). American Beetles, Volume II: Polyphaga: Scarabaeoidea through Curculionoidea. CRC Press LLC, Boca Raton, FL.
 Arnett, Ross H. (2000). American Insects: A Handbook of the Insects of America North of Mexico. CRC Press.
 Evans, Arthur V. (2003). "A checklist of the New World chafers (Coleoptera: Scarabaeidae: Melolonthinae)".
 Richard E. White. (1983). Peterson Field Guides: Beetles. Houghton Mifflin Company.

Polyphylla